Nelaug is a lake in the municipalities of Froland and Åmli in Agder county, Norway. The  lake is formed by a dam which regulates a hydroelectric power plant on the Nidelva river. The village of Nelaug is located near the dam in Froland municipality.

Name
The Old Norse form of the name must have been Niðlaug. The first element Nið is the old name of the river Nidelva and the last element is laug which means "lake".

Media gallery

See also
List of lakes in Aust-Agder

References

Lakes of Agder
Åmli
Froland
Reservoirs in Norway